Takla Chamoun Farjallah (born 12 September 1966) is a Lebanese actress, drama instructor, producer, and the co-founder and CEO of the Lebanese Film Academy. Chamoun is highly regarded in the Middle East and the Arab World for her acting and her ability to mold into a character.

Early life and education 

Takla Chamoun was born and raised in the mountainous village of Jouar el-Haouz to the east of Beirut. Her father Butros was a priest, and her mother a housewife. Chamoun is the middle child of nine siblings, six girls and three boys. She has said that she suffered from Middle child syndrome, and that she had a very close relationship with her mother. Her family was displaced twice, and she was almost taken out of school at the age of 15 because of the Lebanese Civil War; Chamoun recounted in a 2021 interview that she dissuaded her father from leaving her without an education.

The reclusive child was fond of journaling and spending the afternoons in the village sports club playing Table Football. It was not until after her participation in an amateur village play that she discovered her flair for acting. In the mid-1980s, Chamoun participated in a play organized by the village Christian Youth club to celebrate the beatification of Rafqa Ar-Rayes. The play was directed by George Oryan and attended by a large crowd, among whom was her future husband, Tony Farjallah.

Her father Butros did not stop her from pursuing an acting education and career. Chamoun joined the Lebanese University Faculty of Journalism before changing course to join the Faculty of Arts. She graduated with a Diploma in Theatre Acting & Directing from the Lebanese University.

Career

Early career difficulties 
At the start of her acting career, Takla played experimental theater roles before making her film debut. Her talent was spotted by producer Waleed al-Husseini during the premiere of Khodor Alaa Eddin's play Akh ya Baladna in the Picaddilly Theater in the Hamra district of Beirut. She was cast in the role of the wife of Palestinian caricaturist Nagi al-Ali in the eponymous 1991 movie, with legendary Egyptian actor Nour El-Sherif. Chamoun landed roles in the 1996 TV series Akher Mashhad (The last scene), and the controversial 1997 TV series Share' el-Kaslik (Kaslik Street), later renamed Share' al-iyyam (Days Street). Her breakout role was Zalfa the midwife in the Lebanese TV series Men Barsoumi (From Barsoumi) a 2001 14-episode historical miniseries, set in French-mandate Lebanon. Following her performance in Men Barsoumi, for which she garnered accolades, the actress continued to make regular appearances in popular films and series.

During the early 2000s, Chamoun took roles in poorly produced Lebanese TV series; she also worked in dubbing studios "to make ends meet", as she expressed in a 2007 interview; she also deplored the state of Lebanese theater. Her planned theatrical collaboration with renowned director Chakib Khoury dubbed al-Malja2 (The Shelter) was interrupted by the 2006 Lebanon-Israel conflict.

Later work 
Chamoun cofounded the Lebanese Film Academy with her husband Tony Farjallah.

Personal life 
Takla claims to have had a heavy surgical anesthesia-induced near-death experience during her university graduation year at the age of 23. She recounted hearing the medical staff calling to her to wake up while she had an out-of-body experience. At the time, Takla was preparing her graduation thesis based on Eugène Ionesco's Exit the King. The incident, and Ionesco's work, deeply marked Takla. She began the introduction to her graduation thesis with the quotation "Takla Oumi" Wake up Takla; the same call she heard under anesthesia.

Chamoun is known to have refused to cancel a showing of Shakib Khoury's play Mawani' al-hanin (Harbors of Nostalgia) after she was informed of her mother's death from complications of surgery in 1999.

When Men Barsoumi aired, her future husband Tony Farjallah was infatuated with Chamoun and captivated by her performance; however, the two only met a few years later at Farjallah's cinematography workshop in Beirut. They got married shortly afterwards in the Greek Catholic Church in Sarba.

Chamoun describes herself as a nature lover and spends her free time hiking and rock climbing.

Personal views 
Chamoun supports women empowerment in the movie industry in the Middle East; she deplores actress body-shaming, ageism, and actresses' recourse to excessive plastic surgery. The actress also takes pride in not having compromised the quality of her work, and not using feminine sensuality for fame. She supported the Lebanese protests against sectarian rule, endemic corruption and political class ineptitude, she also said that revolution is long overdue.

Filmography

Films

Television

Theater

As producer 

 Morine (2019)

Honors and awards 

 2022 Beirut International Women Film Festival Tanit Award for life's work.
 2021 Chamoun was granted the Golden visa from the government of the UAE. The Visa is awarded to outstanding professional artists.
 2019 Murex d'Or for Best Lebanese Film to Morine, a film produced by Takla and her husband Tony Farjallah's Lebanese Film Academy.
 2015 Lebanese Movies Award for Best Ensemble Cast In A Lebanese Motion Picture for the film Waynon; shared with Diamand Bou Abboud, Nada Abou Farhat, Carol Abboud, and Carmen Lebbos.
 2013 Murex d'Or award for Best Lebanese TV and Cinema Actress.

References

External links

Other sources 

Lebanese film actresses
Lebanese television actresses
Lebanese theatre people
1961 births
Living people
People from Baabda District